hit91.9 Bendigo (official callsign: 3BDG) is a commercial radio station owned and operated by Southern Cross Austereo as part of the Hit Network. The station is broadcast to Central Victoria from studios in the Bendigo suburb of Golden Square.

The station commenced broadcasting in 1999 as 91.9 Star FM when 3CV, a Maryborough-based station, obtained a supplementary FM licence. On 15 December 2016, the station was relaunched as Hit91.9.

Programming
Local programming is produced and broadcast from the station's Golden Square studios from 9am–12pm weekdays, consisting of a three-hour mornings show presented by Michael Billings.

Networked programming originates from studios in Townsville, Melbourne and Sydney.

References

External links

Contemporary hit radio stations in Australia
Radio stations in Bendigo
Radio stations established in 1991
Bendigo